Compsobuthus werneri is a species of scorpion in the family Buthidae.

References

Buthidae
Articles created by Qbugbot
Animals described in 1908